Julija Matej (born 20 November 1925, died before 2012) was a Serbian athlete. She competed in the women's discus throw at the 1948 Summer Olympics.

References

External links
 

1925 births
Year of death missing
Athletes (track and field) at the 1948 Summer Olympics
Serbian female discus throwers
Olympic athletes of Yugoslavia
Place of birth missing